Jordan Faison (born October 17, 1994) is an American professional basketball player for Yokohama Excellence in Japan.

References

External links
Cal Poly Pomona Broncos bio

1994 births
Living people
Aisin AW Areions Anjo players
American expatriate basketball people in Germany
American expatriate basketball people in Japan
American men's basketball players
Basketball players from California
Cal Poly Pomona Broncos men's basketball players
Fukushima Firebonds players
Kyoto Hannaryz players
Sportspeople from Lake Forest, California
Power forwards (basketball)
Yokohama Excellence players